Damendorf Man is a German bog body discovered in 1900 in the See Moor at the village Damendorf in Schleswig-Holstein, Germany.

Display and examination

The remains are on display at the Archäologisches Landesmuseum. What is unique about this bog body is the fact that the weight of the peat in the bog had flattened his body. Only his hair, skin, nails and his few clothes were preserved, along with traces of some bones. He was found with a leather belt, shoes, the parts of a pair of woolen breeches and a pair of woolen  puttees.

Other finds
Prior to the Damendorf Man's discovery, the remains of what are believed to be a woman were found in 1884 in the same bog. The clothing of the corpse is all that remains.

References

1900 archaeological discoveries
Archaeological discoveries in Germany
Archaeology of Schleswig-Holstein
Bog bodies
Iron Age Germany